A leadership election was held by the United Malays National Organisation (UMNO) party on 23 September 2004. It was won by incumbent Prime Minister and acting President of UMNO, Abdullah Ahmad Badawi.

Supreme Council election results
Source

Permanent Chairman

Deputy Permanent Chairman

President

Deputy President

Vice Presidents

Supreme Council Members

See also
2008 Malaysian general election
Second Abdullah cabinet

References

2004 elections in Malaysia
United Malays National Organisation leadership election
United Malays National Organisation leadership elections